Pettorano sul Gizio is a comune and town in the province of L'Aquila in the Abruzzo region of central-southern Italy. The Gizio river flows in the communal territory.

Notable people
Baron Michele Leone (1909-1988) - professional wrestler

See also
Cantelmo Castle

References

 
Hilltowns in Abruzzo